A Taste of Cold Steel or (Chinese: 武林風雲; Wu lin feng yun) is a 1970 Hong Kong Shaw Brothers' action film adventure directed by Yueh Feng. It is a sequel to Yueh Feng's earlier Shaw Brothers' film, Rape of the Sword.

Plot

The three Gan sisters are mourning the death of their father when they are visited by Prince Lu Tien Hsia, who wishes to pay his respects. Lu informs them that their father's sword, the Purple Light Sword, should be offered to the Emperor. At that moment, the sisters' cousin, Hsu, arrives and warns them that Lu's real intentions are to steal the sword for himself and that Lu and his father had plotted to kill the Gan sister's father. A battle breaks out and Lu escapes without the sword.

Concerned that Lu will return to try and retake the sword, the second Gan sister leaves to seek help from her Uncle, Hsu's father. Lu, bloodied and exhausted from the battle stumbles into a run-down and seemingly abandoned temple, where he encounters the Five Tiger; Brave Tiger, One-eyed Tiger, Crippled Tiger, Drunken Tiger and Sick Tiger. After a short battle, Lu convinces the Five Tigers that he knows a place filled with money, jewels and the Purple Light Sword, if they are brave enough to attack it - The Gan residence.

Lu, the Five Tigers and a band of warriors attack the Gan residence. During the battle, Lu instructs some of the warriors to burn the residence down. Hsu evacuates the injured third Gan sister but, by the time he returns, the battle is over and the eldest Gan sister has been taken prisoner by the Five Tigers, along with the Purple Light Sword. The attackers celebrate their victory at an Inn. While distracted by the celebrations, Lu attempts to double-cross the Five Tigers and take the Purple Light Sword, which Brave Tiger had claimed for his own. A battle occurs between the Lu and his warriors, and the Five Tigers. The warriors are defeated and Lu is taken captive by the Tigers, although Brave Tiger is injured by a poisoned dart in the process. One of the warriors is sent to Lu's father to request a ransom while the remainder are brutally slaughtered.

The second Gan sister, her uncle and a band of warriors arrive at the remains of the Gan residence and agree to set out to track Lu and his father down. Meanwhile, Hsu and the third Gan sister arrive at a nearby town, whose streets are abandoned. They seek out a doctor to treat the third Gan sister's injury. They learn that the doctor is also being forced by Brave Tiger to treat his wound from the poisoned dart. After treating her wound and allowing her time to rest, Hsu and the doctor come up with a plan to steal back the Purple Light Sword from Brave Tiger. The second Gan sister finds Lu's father and battles her way into his room. Lu's father informs her that Lu and the Purple Light Sword have been taken by the Five Tigers and asks her to rescue him. She kills him instead as revenge for her father's death and leaves to track down Lu and the Five Tigers.

Back at the Five Tigers' camp, the doctor distracts Brave Tiger while Hsu attempts to steal the Sword. However, the second sister, who has also stumbled upon the camp, accidentally foils Hsu's attempt to take the sword, and as a result, Brave Tiger kills the doctor for his subterfuge. The pair team up and fight the Tiger Five and their men, managing to kill Drunken Tiger, before being captured when Brave Tiger orders them to surrender or he will kill the captured eldest Gan sister. One-eyed Tiger goes to the doctor's residence, where the third Gan sister is recovering, realising that is where she would be, if the doctor was helping them. As One-eyed Tiger and the third Gan sister fight, an elderly Taoist priest arrives at the door and kills One-eyed Tiger before capturing the third Gan sister and taking her to the Five Tigers' camp.

At the camp, the Taoist priest is revealed to be Lu's master and he frees Lu and the pair begin battling the camp. The sisters and Hsu manage to break free and join in the fighting. The remaining Tigers are defeated by the Taoist priest. The sisters' uncle arrives with reinforcements, who proceed to burn the camp down. The Taoist priest meets up with the Gan sisters, Hsu and his father and informs them that he was preparing to kill Lu for bring shame and dishonoring his teachings of doing good and helping the weak and the poor. Instead he hands over the Purple Light Sword and Lu to the sisters so they may have their justice. Lu runs into the fire and dies rather than face his fate.

Cast
Shu Pei-pei
Chang Yi as Hsu Chin
Essie Lin Chia as Kan Ah-nan
Chan Hung Lit as Prince Lu Tien Hsia
Wang Hsieh as Uncle Hsu
Ching Yu
Wen Chen
Mien Fang as Doctor Kuo
Simon Hsu as Crippled Tiger
Chung-Shun Huang as  Fierce Tiger
Liu Hung as Drunken Tiger
Ku Feng as One-eyed Tiger
Kun Li as Little Brother
Yunzhong Li as Prince Wu Yi
Wu Ma as Sick Tiger
Pao Chin Yeh as  Songstress at Inn
Sammo Hung Kam-Bo

External links
 
 A Taste of Cold Steel at Hong Kong Cinémagic

1970 films
Hong Kong action films
Shaw Brothers Studio films
1970s action thriller films
Films directed by Yueh Feng